TeknoWhore is a studio album by the American industrial metal band Bile, released in 1996. The album was released on the now defunct Energy Records and had not been reproduced since the company's fold in 2000. After being out of print for three years, Bile decided to re-release the album alongside their out-of-print first release, Suckpump, as a digipak titled Frankenhole in 2003. TeknoWhore was written and recorded by Krztoff, produced by Krztoff and Slave, mixed by Slave, and engineered by Steve Spaperri and Patrick Gordon.

Critical reception
The Washington Post wrote that "the band's world view is as contrived and perverse as its style, which alternates slamming synthbeats with aimless interludes of burbling music and ironic samples from old movies and documentaries."

Track listing
 "Intro" - 2:09
 "Teknowhore" - 2:08
 "Weather Control" - 4:38
 "No One I Call Friend" - 6:28
 "Habitual Sphere" - 4:38
 "Compound Pressure" - 5:14
 "Interstate Hate Song" - 3:35
 "Green Day" - 1:12
 "No I Don't Know" - 2:31
 "Suckers" - 2:18
 "Lowest Form" - 4:54
 "You Can't Love This (Pt. 1)" - 1:00
 "You Can't Love This (Pt. 2)" - 6:08
 "You Can't Love This (Pt. 3)" - 3:21
 "You Can't Love This (Pt. 4)" - 6:26
 "Solitude Is Bliss" - 10:15

Credits
Bile in the studio
 Krztoff - Lead vocals, guitarz, bass, sitar, drums, distortions, atmospheres, Kawai K-1, samples, porno, programming, Zoom FX, pedals, Roland W-30, line input overdrives.
 Slave - a.k.a David Stagnari - Programming, EMS-Synthi, RFB-40 shortwave, Juno-106, Korg Monopoly, Oberheim Matrix 6, samples, loops, treatments.
 Brett and Archie A.K. did backup vox on "Teknowhore" and "No I Don't Know."  
 Omen spewed 'emu omenfuck' backgrounds on "You Can't Love This."
Bile on the road
 Krztoff - Lead vox, guitarz, programs
 Brett Pirozzi - Vox, bass, guitar
 R.H. Bear - Keyboards, bass and video
 Slave - Keyboards, EMS Synthi, programs
 Darrell - Lightning and effects
No Live freakshow
Produced by Slave and Krztoff
Mixed by Slave
Recorded in Music Palace, Long Island, N.Y., Summer-Fall 1995
Engineered by Steve "Potso" Spaperri and Patrick Gordon
1/2in. tape editor - Slave
Album arrangement, sequence and interludes by Krztoff and Slave

References

1996 albums
Bile (band) albums